Italo Selvelli (10 November 1863 – 11 May 1918) was an Italian composer, pianist and orchestra director, who lived and worked in Constantinople during the last decades of the Ottoman Empire.

Biography
Italo Giovanni Selvelli was born in Constantinople in 1863. His parents were Michele Selvelli (Fano, Italy, 1825 - Constantinople, 1895) and Maria Sigalla (Syros, Greece, 1838 - Constantinople, 1904). Italo Selvelli attended the Royal College of Music of Palermo between 1876 and 1881.

Since 1887 he was active in conducting operas, operettas and ballets at the Nouveau Theatre and Concordia Theatre of Constantinople. Throughout his life he also practised as a music teacher for several members of the Ottoman aristocracy.

On 16 June 1889 he married Anna Maria Pussich (1866-1954) who gave him two sons and two daughters.

In 1891 Italo Selvelli was appointed director of the orchestra and the music school of Tophane, the first non-military band of the Ottoman Empire, founded by Zeki Pasha.

In 1909, when Sultan Reşâd came to the Imperial throne with the name of Mehmed V, an open competition was called for deciding the new official march of the Sultan. To be chosen was Italo Selvelli's polyphonic composition, since then known as the "Reşadiye Marşı" ("March of Mehmed V Resad"). This march was actually the last official personal march of a Sultan in the history of the Ottoman Empire, as the subsequent and final Sultan Mehmed VI, who ascended the throne in 1918 in a difficult political situation, refused to adopt a personal march.

Italo Selvelli died on 11 May 1918, most likely from an anthrax infection. He is buried in the Osmanbey Christian Cemetery of Istanbul.

Bibliography
 Aksoy Bülent, Avrupalı Gezginlerin Gözüyle Osmanlılarda Musıki, Pan Yayıncılık, Istanbul 2003
 Gazimihal Mahmud Ragıp, Musıki Sözlüğü, Millî Eğitim Basımevi, Istanbul 1961
 Feldman Walter, Music of the Ottoman Court, Verlag für Wissenschaft und Bildung, Berlin 1996
 Özalp Mehmet Nazmi, Türk Mûsikîsi Tarihi I-II, Milli Eğitim Bakanlığı Yayınları, Istanbul 2000
 Uçan Ali, Türk Müzik Kültürü, Evrensel Müzikevi, Ankara 2005
 Booklet of CD “Osmanli Marslari-The Ottoman Military Music in 78 rpm Records”, Kalan 1999
 Booklet of CD “An Album of Turkish History for the Piano” performed by Aydin Karlibel, Kalan 2002
   Levantine Musicians in Music Culture of Ottoman Empire

Other sources
 Archives of the Osmanbey Cemetery of Istanbul

1863 births
1918 deaths
Italian composers
Italian male composers
Musicians from Istanbul
19th-century Italian musicians
19th-century pianists
Italian male pianists
19th-century Italian male musicians